This is a list of the National Register of Historic Places listings in Dickens County, Texas.

This is intended to be a complete list of properties listed on the National Register of Historic Places in Dickens County, Texas. There is one property listed on the National Register in the county. This property is also a State Antiquities Landmark and a Recorded Texas Historic Landmark.

Current listings

The locations of National Register properties may be seen in a mapping service provided.

|}

See also

National Register of Historic Places listings in Texas
Recorded Texas Historic Landmarks in Dickens County

References

External links

Dickens County, Texas
Dickens County
Buildings and structures in Dickens County, Texas